The Legislative Assembly of Sevastopol is the regional parliament of Sevastopol. It de facto replaced the Sevastopol City Council after the Russian military intervention in Crimea in 2014. The legislature is composed of 24 members.

History

The Legislative Assembly of Sevastopol replaced the Sevastopol City Council on 17 March 2014 after Russian control of the Crimean peninsula was established. On 18 March, after Russia formally annexed Crimea, it became the legislature of the federal city of Sevastopol, a de facto federal subject of Russia. The first elections were held on 14 September 2014 with the ruling party, United Russia, winning a supermajority with 22 seats and the Liberal Democratic Party of Russia winning 2 seats, according to official results.

Elections

2014

2019

External links
Official website of the Legislative Assembly 

Government of Sevastopol
Sevastopol
Sevastopol
2014 establishments in Russia
Politics of Sevastopol
Annexation of Crimea by the Russian Federation